The Neo were a fictional race of superhumans appearing in American comic books published by Marvel Comics. Before facing global extinction, the Neo were another of Earth's races, apparently a very ancient one that preferred to live in seclusion. They appear to be a subspecies of mutants, but much more powerful. This is seen in the way they call mutants "spikes," as if they didn't even register on the Neo's power scales.

Species Biography
Their existence was kept hidden for millennia as they had chosen a solitary life in their own community. They prospered until the day the High Evolutionary activated his machines (from an orbital space station) that switched off all mutant genes. Worldwide, all mutants lost their powers and became baseline humans. The Neo suffered many casualties. Among the dead was the daughter of Domina and Hunter, the leaders of one of Neo's warclans. They swear revenge on whoever is responsible.

The Neo engaged in fighting the X-Men, who had no intention of letting them destroy the world. It was the Neo who sabotaged the High Evolutionary's space station, destroyed 17 of Mister Sinister's bases, and hunted down the mutants hidden by Charles Xavier in NYC. They are all top-notch fighters and can withstand significant punishment before going down. They are also quite technologically advanced.

The Neo themselves had split up in several different factions or tribes. Apart from the Warclan, the different X-Men teams also fought other groups of Neo called "The Shockwave Riders", who have psionic powers and ride anti-grav skimmers, "The Lost Souls", who psychically trap souls near death and cause them to despair forever, "The Goth", a trio of super-powered individuals who acted as a shadowy underground slave trade organization under the lead of a man that called himself "The Goth". They used their own group of inter-dimensional slavers known as the "Crimson Pirates". The Neo groups persisted as legends among mutants even in Cable's time, where it's said even Apocalypse respected them, a testament to their power.

Domina's Warclan was later attacked by Magneto, who demanded that they join him in war against the humans and stop the internecine warfare between themselves and other mutants. They refused, and Magneto slaughtered two of them in a few seconds, buying Domina's (who was amazed by his might) obedience as a result. Domina and her Warclan have not been seen since the attack on Genosha, and it is not known whether any of them survived. 

They later faced the Young X-Men, although this appears to be part of Prodigy's Danger Cave.

Other groups of Neo, known as the Guardian Clan, War Clan, Spirit Clan, and Mind Clan, have been revealed to still exist; the latter two are based respectively in Southeast Asia and the Arctic. The Guardian Clan and War Clan jointly attacked Utopia in search of answers as to why many of the members of their species had lost their powers and no new births had occurred. Before Cyclops could explain these events, a group of supreme beings called the Evolutionaries intervened and, in the blink of an eye caused the global extinction of the entire Neo subspecies based on the premise that the Neo had ceased to evolve and thereby posed a threat to the survival of baseline Homo Superior.

Apparently, due to their inter-dimensional travels, the Crimson Pirates were able to survive the global extinction of their species and have since reappeared in the Nightcrawler solo series. One of their members, Bloody Bess, teamed up with Nightcrawler to fight against the other Crimson Pirates and Tullamore Voge (see Nightcrawler (vol. 4) #8-12)

Powers and abilities
The Neo were a more powerful variety of mutant. Like the mutants, they have an array of individual powers. They also appear to have slightly greater strength, speed, endurance, and reflexes than the average mutant.

See also
Mutant (Marvel Comics)

References

External links

Characters created by Chris Claremont
Marvel Comics characters with superhuman strength
Marvel Comics mutants
X-Men supporting characters